Jean Goulème (3 June 1907 – 4 January 2000) was a French racing cyclist. He rode in the 1930 Tour de France.

References

1907 births
2000 deaths
French male cyclists
Place of birth missing